Jesse Mason (born April 25, 1984 is a Canadian racecar driver from Niagara Falls, Ontario.

After karting and some amateur classes in Canada, Mason competed in the British Formula Three Championship National Class for Performance Racing in 2003 and finished 6th in class points. He also made two starts in the German Formula Three Championship for the same team that year. Mason returned to North America and shifted to the Indy Pro Series in 2004 competing in the first 10 races of the season for Brian Stewart Racing falling from 3rd to 6th in points by missing the final 2 races. He posted best finishes of 3rd at Homestead and Nashville. Mason then put his driving career on hiatus to study Motorsports Engineering and Design at the Swansea Institute in Wales. After graduation, he commenced active involvement with the Canadian Motor Speedway development in Canada, which he remains an active member of the development team. He returned to the Firestone Indy Lights Series, formerly the Indy Pro Series, in 2009 competing for Guthrie Meyer Racing. However, Guthrie Meyer Racing shut down after the Freedom 100, leaving Mason without a ride.

References

External links

Jesse Mason driver profile at IndyCar.com

1984 births
Living people
British Formula Three Championship drivers
German Formula Three Championship drivers
Indy Lights drivers
Racing drivers from Ontario
Sportspeople from Niagara Falls, Ontario

Performance Racing drivers